Niměřice is a municipality and village in Mladá Boleslav District in the Central Bohemian Region of the Czech Republic. It has about 300 inhabitants.

Administrative parts
Villages of Dolní Cetno and Horní Cetno are administrative parts of Niměřice.

References

Villages in Mladá Boleslav District